The Church of St. Nicholas in Tropino (Николо-Тропинская церковь) is a ruined 17th-century church on the right bank of the Kotorosl River in Yaroslavl. It has been expanded and renovated on several occasions in the 18th and 19th centuries. The site used to be prone to seasonal flooding. A memorial cross near the church marked the spot where Patriarch Nikon expired in August 1681. What remains of the old building is currently used for storing fish.

Nicholas
17th-century churches in Russia
17th-century Eastern Orthodox church buildings
Cultural heritage monuments of regional significance in Yaroslavl Oblast